The Danzhou dialect, locally known as Xianghua, is a Chinese variety of uncertain affiliation spoken in the area of Danzhou in northwestern Hainan, China.
It was classified as Yue in the Language Atlas of China,
but in more recent work is treated as an unclassified southern variety.

Varieties
Regional varieties are Bei'an 北岸音, Shuinan 水南音, Zhoujia 昼家音, Shanshang 山上音, Haitou 海头音, and Wuhu 五湖音.

Distribution
The Danzhou dialect is spoken in the following areas of Hainan (Hainan 1994:253).
most of Danzhou 儋州市 except for the southeastern part of Danzhou
Changjiang Li Autonomous County 昌江县 (northern coast)
Nanluo 南罗 and Haiwei 海尾 area
Xiyuan 西缘, Shiluo Town 石碌镇, Changjiang city
northern Baisha Li Autonomous County 白沙县 (in just over 10 villages near the border with Danzhou)
peripheral villages of Dongfang 东方市, Ledong 乐东, Qiongzhong 琼中, and Sanya 三亚

References

Hainan
Varieties of Chinese